Lenko Latkov (1975 – September 13, 2003) was a Bulgarian rapist, pedophile and serial killer, responsible for killing three elderly women in the Haskovo Province from 1999 to 2000, as well as several rapes. He was also suspected of another three similar murders in the Plovdiv Province. Latkov was murdered prior to his trial by his cellmate Sami Bayram Aptullah (AKA Sali Abdullah), who was serving time for an attempted murder.

Biography
Latkov's early life was marked by stays at various orphanages, soon to be followed by indictments for rapes in Veliko Tarnovo as an adolescent. The mentally-ill man was released despite the charges, only to be rearrested years later on March 13, 2003 for kidnapping and raping a 13-year-old boy from a Haskovo bus stop. Following a 5-hour long interrogation, he confessed to raping a 16-year-old girl in Veliko Tarnovo and the murder of three elderly women in the Haskovo Province:
 Lilyana Ivanova (84), murdered in Haskovo, 1999
 Kaluda Golemanova, murdered in Lyubimets, 2000
 Elena Atanasova (71), passed away after brutal torture in Biser, 2000

Latkov was also a prime suspect in another three murders committed in the Plovdiv Province, but no information is available about these murders. Following his arrest, he was moved into a psychiatric hospital in Lovech. There, ten days before his death, he wrote a letter to the investigating authorities in Haskovo in which he talked about his loneliness, his appreciation of their humane treatment towards him and a request for some cigarettes.

Death
After reevaluations from psychologists and investigators alike, Latkov was moved to a prison in Stara Zagora, where he shared a cell with Sami Bayram Aptullah, another mentally-ill prisoner serving an 8-year sentence for attempted murder. On September 13, the two began arguing about something, with the physically stronger Aptullah beating up and strangling Latkov in a matter of seconds. Shortly after, he began banging at his cell door, attracting the attention of guards and medical personnel who tried to save Latkov's life, but to no avail. Following this event, Aptullah was moved into a solitary cell.

See also
List of serial killers by country

References

1975 births
2003 deaths
Bulgarian rapists
Bulgarian serial killers
Male serial killers
People from Haskovo
Serial killers murdered in prison custody
Violence against women in Bulgaria